Geauga County Airport , is a public use airport in southern Geauga County, Ohio, United States. Owned and operated by Geauga County since 1968, it serves all of Geauga County. The airport is located 40 nautical miles (12 mi, 19 km) east of downtown Cleveland.

The airport was built in 1968 as part of a statewide initiative for each county to have its own airport. It serves as the area base for University Hospitals' AirMed 1 medical helicopter, as well as for The Cleveland Soaring Society, a glider club. It is home to Experimental Aircraft Association Chapter 5.

Facilities and aircraft 
For the 12-month period ending August 26, 2011, the airport had an average of 20 aircraft movements per day: 97% general aviation, and 3% air taxi. At that time there were 42 aircraft based at this airport: 32 single-engine, 6 gliders, 3 ultralight and 1 helicopter.

References

External links
 Geauga County Airport
 Fly Geauga

Airports in Ohio
Transportation in Geauga County, Ohio